The Parker Road–Charlotte River Bridge, also known as the 10 Mile Road–Charlotte River Bridge, is a bridge building located on Parker Road (now East 10-Mile Road) over the Charlotte River in Bruce Township, Michigan.  It was listed on the National Register of Historic Places in 2000.

Description
The Parker Road–Charlotte River Bridge is a three-panel, rigid-connected Warren Pony Truss bridge; the structural members of the bridge are made pairs of steel angles connected back-to-back, rather than the more traditional box beams. I-beams supporting the wooden deck are bolted to the upright truss. The span has been recently braced with timber pilings in the center, but otherwise is relatively unchanged. The bridge is closed to traffic and is no longer maintained.

Historic context
In the era before standard bridge designs were drafted by the Michigan State Highway Department, local road commissions were tempted to reduce costs by using lighter two-angle superstructure elements, as in this bridge.  This bridge was built in 1914 by the Minneapolis Bridge Company, likely at the behest of the Bruce Township Board.  It is the only example of this type of two-angle superstructure truss bridge in Michigan that has been definitively dated.

See also

References

External links
Photos from HistoricBridges.org

Road bridges on the National Register of Historic Places in Michigan
Bridges completed in 1914
Buildings and structures in Chippewa County, Michigan
Transportation in Chippewa County, Michigan
National Register of Historic Places in Chippewa County, Michigan
Steel bridges in the United States
Warren truss bridges in the United States